David Ritossa (born 22 January 1971) is an Australian cricketer. He played in one first-class and one List A match for South Australia in 1992/93.

See also
 List of South Australian representative cricketers

References

External links
 

1971 births
Living people
Australian cricketers
South Australia cricketers
Cricketers from Adelaide